The ultimate shrew (Crocidura ultima) is a species of mammal in the family Soricidae. It is endemic to Kenya.  Its natural habitat is subtropical or tropical moist montane forests.

Sources
 Hutterer, R. & Oguge, N. 2004.  Crocidura ultima.   2006 IUCN Red List of Threatened Species.   Downloaded on 30 July 2007.

Mammals of Kenya
Crocidura
Endemic fauna of Kenya
Mammals described in 1915
Taxonomy articles created by Polbot